Roy Wilkins Auditorium (nicknamed The Roy) is a 5,000-seat multi-purpose arena in St. Paul, Minnesota. Designed by the renowned municipal architect Clarence W. Wigington, it was built in 1932 as an arena extension to the existing St. Paul Auditorium (built 1906–1907). When the old auditorium wing was demolished in 1982, Wigington's arena wing remained. It was renamed for Roy Wilkins in 1985. It is part of the RiverCentre complex, down the hall from the Xcel Energy Center, home of the National Hockey League's Minnesota Wild.

Events
The University of Minnesota's Golden Gophers ice hockey team used the arena as one of its home rinks from 1932 until 1950. The Minneapolis Lakers used the Auditorium when their regular home, the Minneapolis Auditorium, was not available. The Minnesota State Boys' High School Hockey Tournament was held at the Auditorium from 1945 to 1968. It was home to the Minnesota Fighting Saints ice hockey team of the World Hockey Association (WHA) in fall 1972, before the team moved to the St. Paul Civic Center. The St. Paul Slam of the International Basketball Association played at Wilkins for two seasons, 1996–97 and 1997–98. The Minnesota Ripknees also played at the auditorium for their 2007–08 season.

In 2000 it hosted ECW's pay-per-view Anarchy Rulz.

Since 2005, Roy Wilkins Auditorium has hosted games for the Minnesota Roller Derby league, one of the founding members of the Women's Flat Track Derby Association (WFTDA). The WFTDA held the 2015 WFTDA Championships at Roy Wilkins Auditorium November 6–8, 2015.

References

External links

 
 Minnesota Roller Derby
 History of St. Paul Auditorium

1932 establishments in Minnesota
American Basketball Association (2000–present) venues
Clarence W. Wigington buildings
Indoor arenas in Minnesota
Indoor ice hockey venues in Saint Paul, Minnesota
Minnesota Fighting Saints
Sports venues in Saint Paul, Minnesota
World Hockey Association venues
Sports venues completed in 1932
Defunct college ice hockey venues in the United States